Daniele Berretta (born 8 March 1972 in Rome) is a retired Italian football player.

He played 12 seasons (240 games, 19 goals) in the Serie A for A.S. Roma, Cagliari Calcio, Atalanta B.C., A.C. Ancona and Brescia Calcio. He played for Roma in the UEFA Cup, scoring a goal against FC Dynamo Moscow in 1996.

After several years with Cagliari, he left for Atalanta after fighting the manager Gianfranco Bellotto during a training session.

Honours
 1994 UEFA European Under-21 Football Championship winner.

References

1972 births
Living people
Italian footballers
Italy under-21 international footballers
Serie A players
Serie B players
A.S. Roma players
L.R. Vicenza players
Cagliari Calcio players
Atalanta B.C. players
A.C. Ancona players
Brescia Calcio players
Association football midfielders